Vacatia, founded in 2013 and based in San Francisco, California, spun out of Vacation Listing Service Inc., launching originally as an online marketplace for buying and selling timeshare interests.

History
In September 2013, the company raised a $5 million seed round from travel, hotel and vacation rental industry veterans, such as Spencer Rascoff (Zillow, Expedia, Hotwire), Erik Blachford (Expedia), Robert Spottswood (Hyatt Vacation Ownership), Raymond L. “Rip” Gallein Jr. (Starwood Vacation Ownership and Marriott Vacations Worldwide), and Barry Sternlicht and Steve Hankin (Starwood Capital Group). Other investors included Bee Partners, Peterson Ventures and Meyer Ventures, as well as personal investments from Egon Durban of Silver Lake Partners and Gene Frantz of Google Capital.

In April 2015, the company raised $8.8 million in a Series A round led by Javelin Venture Partners. 

At the same time Vacatia announced its Series A funding, it announced substantial management team changes, the most prominent being the promotion of co-founder Caroline Shin from COO to CEO, with co-founder and former CEO Keith Cox being named Chairman. In addition, Mike Janes, formerly CMO at StubHub and GM of the online store at Apple Inc., joined as chief marketing officer.

In November 2015, Vacatia publicly launched its vacation rental marketplace.

In May 2016, Vacatia expanded beyond the U.S. by adding 20 resorts in Cancun and Cabo San Lucas, Mexico.

In April 2016, Vacatia was integrated with HomeToGo.

In May 2016, Disney Vacation Club approved Vacatia as a seller.

References

External links
 

Online marketplaces of the United States
American companies established in 2013